Pawluki  is a village in the administrative district of Gmina Hanna, within Włodawa County, Lublin Voivodeship, in eastern Poland, close to the border with Belarus.

GPS Coordinates
DD Coordinates: 51.666664 23.5499978
DMS Coordinates: 51°39'59.99" N 23°32'59.99" E
Geohash Coordinates: u90tzvss4sppg
UTM Coordinates: 34U 676342.59842712 5727043.7494987

References

Pawluki